Fort Bosley was a fort fortified in 1777 in the Susquehanna Valley frontier to protect settlers. It was one of roughly a dozen frontier forts in the immediate Susquehanna Valley region. It was located near a grist mill built by John Bosley in 1773.

History
With the signing of the Treaty of Fort Stanwix (1768) between Great Britain and the Iroquois, permanent European settlement began to occur throughout much of present-day Pennsylvania, including the Susquehanna Valley. One of the first settlers near present-day Washingtonville was John Bosley who had moved to the area with slaves from Maryland.

Bosley built a grist mill along the eastern banks of Chillisquaque Creek near its convergence with Mud Run in 1773 (although the Commonwealth of Pennsylvania recognizes the Borough of Washingtonville's settlement as 1775). With the large area of fine arable land along the Chillisquaque between the Muncy Hills to the north and Washingtonville Hill to the south, Bosley's Mill became a necessity for settling farmers of the immediate area.

Despite authorized European settlement throughout the Susquehanna Valley, hostilities with natives of the area were commonplace. The magnitude of these tensions only intensified after the outbreak of the Revolutionary War. Following the defeat of General George Washington at the Battle of Brandywine, the decision was made to develop a system of forts along the Susquehanna Valley frontier to protect settlers and support the greater defense of Fort Augusta at present day Sunbury. Almost all of these frontier forts, roughly a dozen in the immediate Susquehanna Valley region, were developed either along the north or west branches of the Susquehanna River. Bosley's Mill, which was fortified in 1777, was one of the few protected locations off of the two river branches.

This remotely located mill formed the nucleus of a larger fort which had portholes in its walls and for a while, a small howitzer mounted within its enclosure. In times of an anticipated raid, the settlers of the valley surrounding Chillisquaque Creek fled to this fortification for protection. Fort Bosley as it became called, was the only fortified location in Montour County, Pennsylvania during the Revolutionary War(3). Records from the 19th century have also listed this fortification as “Brady’s Fort” and “Boyle’s Fort.”

In 1779, the more heavily manned Fort Freeland between present day Watsontown and Turbotville fell to native marauders. Following this defeat, Boone's Fort between Milton, Pennsylvania and Watsontown was subsequently deserted. These two events meant that Fort Bosley was the only line of northern defense before a potential attack on Fort Augusta. Despite the collapse of these other nearby fortifications, Fort Bosley never had a garrison of more than twenty troops. The fall of these two nearby installations, a lack of militiamen to defend Fort Bosley, Fort Bosley's remote location, and scarcity of provisions made this fort particularly susceptible to an attack.

Additionally, two traveled Indian paths existed in the immediate area. The first trail led from the Wyoming Valley to Muncy. The original course of this path in present-day Montour County never diverged more than half a mile away from the current railroad line that travels through Strawberry Ridge and Talen Energy’s Montour Power Station. The second trail, known as the Muncy-Mahoning path, roughly followed Mahoning Creek near present day Danville, north passed Washingtonville and the Montour Preserve, before ending in Muncy.

Despite its vulnerabilities, there are no known records of any attacks on Fort Bosley. Notably, the fort was able to successfully provide security to the family of John Eves (the founders of nearby Millville, Pennsylvania) following the Wyoming Valley Massacre. Although the fort was last garrisoned in 1780 under the command of a Captain Kemplon, the installation remained valuable as a grist mill following the American Revolution.

A great famine is said to have taken place in the immediate area in 1788. Phillip Maus, founder of present day Mausdale, Pennsylvania and one of Montour County’s first permanent European settlers, purchased grain from Paradise farm near Watsontown and had it delivered to Bosley’s Mill during this time of hardship. From records possessed by Phillip Maus, there is reference that settlers who had homes in the immediate vicinity of Bosley’s Mill were also able to obtain the grain delivered from Paradise farm. At the time, the area surrounding the mill had already become to be known as “Washington” (which later became known as Washingtonville).

John Bosley would eventually sell his mill, along with its surrounding land in 1795. He and his wife Susannah then moved to upstate New York where John would die in 1800. Bosley's Mill, which played a critical role both as the nucleus of the fort that defended the Chillisquaque Creek valley as well as for the development of present-day Washingtonville, burned down in 1826. No evidence of the mill exists today although the Pennsylvania Historical and Museum Commission dedicated a marker along Route 54 to commemorate the mill's time as a fort on May 12, 1947.

References

Colonial forts in Pennsylvania
Buildings and structures in Montour County, Pennsylvania